Lawrence M. Solan (born 1952) is the Don Forchelli Professor of Law and Director of the Center for the Study of Law, Language and Cognition at Brooklyn Law School.

Biography
Solan was born in New York City to Harold and Shirley Solan.

He obtained a B.A. summa cum laude from Brandeis University in 1974, a Ph.D. in Linguistics from the University of Massachusetts, Amherst, in 1978, and a J.D. from Harvard Law School in 1982.

Solan was a law clerk for Justice Stewart Pollock of the Supreme Court of New Jersey from 1982-83. He was later an associate and then a partner in the New York City law firm of Orans, Elsen and Lupert, from 1983–96, focusing on complex civil litigation.

He joined the faculty of Brooklyn Law School in 1996, where he is now the Don Forchelli Professor of Law and Director of the Center for the Study of Law, Language and Cognition. Much of his academic legal career has been devoted to studying and writing about the way in which linguistic analysis can inform the legal system, and he has taught courses on the subject at Brooklyn Law School, Yale Law School, and Princeton University.

Among Solan's books are The Language of Judges (2010), The Language of Statutes: Laws and Their Interpretation (2010), and (with Peter Tiersma) Speaking of Crime: The Language of Criminal Justice.

He has been President of the International Association of Forensic Linguistics.

References 

Harvard Law School alumni
University of Massachusetts Amherst College of Humanities and Fine Arts alumni
1952 births
Linguists from the United States
Living people
Brandeis University alumni
Brooklyn Law School faculty
Educators from New York City